Keçili or Kechili or Ketschily or Kechilli may refer to:

 Keçili, Shakhbuz, Azerbaijan
 Keçili, Shamkir, Azerbaijan
 Kechilikaya, Azerbaijan
 Keçili, Bucak, Turkey
 Keçili, Olur